Sami Trabelsi (born 4 February 1968) is a Tunisian former football player and the head coach of Al Sailiya in the Qatar Stars League.

He played for a few clubs, most notably CS Sfaxien.

He has 52 caps for the Tunisia national football team and was a participant at the 1998 FIFA World Cup.
After retirement as a player, he became an assistant coach for the Tunisia and coached national side for one match against France as a caretaker coach.

On March 11, 2011, Trabelsi was officially appointed as the manager of the Tunisian National Team. But following the failure of the national team to get past the first round at the African Nations Cup 2013, Tunisia accepted Trabelsi's resignation, and he was replaced by the Tunisian coach Nabil Maâloul.

On June 8, 2013, Trabelsi was named head coach of the Qatari side Al Sailiya.

Playing career
Sami marked his debut in the club Sfax Railways Sports before joining CS Sfaxien. In 1998 FIFA World Cup, Sami became the leader of the Tunisian national team and he formed an undefeated defense line with Khaled Badra.

Managerial statistics

References

External links

1968 births
Living people
Tunisian footballers
Tunisian football managers
1998 FIFA World Cup players
Tunisia international footballers
Sfax Railways Sports players
CS Sfaxien players
Al-Rayyan SC players
1996 African Cup of Nations players
1998 African Cup of Nations players
2012 Africa Cup of Nations managers
Tunisia national football team managers
Expatriate football managers in Qatar
2013 Africa Cup of Nations managers
Association football defenders
Qatar Stars League players
Tunisian expatriate football managers